Esther Schapira (born January 23, 1961 in Frankfurt) is a German journalist and filmmaker, currently politics and society editor at the German public television network, the Hessischer Rundfunk.

The latter won her and her co-producer, Kamil Taylan, a Prix Europa award. In 2009, she produced a second documentary about the death of al-Durrah,  ("The Child, the Death, and the Truth").

Background
Schapira completed her Abitur at the Frankfurt  in 1982, and went on to study German and English language and literature, as well as theatre, film and television.

Awards
In 2007, she won the Buber-Rosenzweig-Medaille with Georg M. Hafner, and a commendation during Prix Europa for the Theo van Gogh documentary.

Books
with Hafner, Georg M. . Campus Sachbuch, Frankfurt 2000. 
with Hafner, Georg M. . Eichborn, Köln 2015,

Articles
 , in: Robertson-von Trotha, Caroline Y. (ed.):  (= /Interdisciplinary Studies on Culture and Society, Vol. 3), Baden-Baden 2008.

See also
 Pallywood

References

External links
 
 
 Esther Schapira at Kino.de
  Esther Schapira at Filmportal.de

German journalists
Hessischer Rundfunk people
1961 births
Living people